Foro Sol is a sports and entertainment venue built in 1993 inside the Autódromo Hermanos Rodríguez in eastern Mexico City. It is located near the Mexico City International Airport and is operated by Grupo CIE.

The venue was originally built for staging large music concerts. Initially called the Autódromo, it could accommodate up to 50,000 people. From 2000 to 2014, it was used as a baseball stadium as well, hosting the Diablos Rojos del México and Tigres de México. Foro Sol is the second largest concert venue in Mexico City; the largest, Estadio Azteca, has a capacity of 87,523.

Its name comes from a popular beer brand of the Cervecería Cuauhtémoc Moctezuma group.

Since 2015, Foro Sol hosts the Mexican Grand Prix and since 2016 the Mexico City ePrix, the venue has become part of the track and has turns within the venue. It also increased the circuit capacity by 25,000 spectators. The venue has been noted for its unique nature.

In 2019, the park hosted the Race of Champions and Stadium Super Trucks; the latter served as both a competing ROC category and standalone event to conclude its 2018 season.

Usage

Baseball

Foro Sol was inaugurated as a baseball park on 2 June 2000 with a match between the Tigres de México and the Diablos Rojos del México. Both teams had previously played in the Parque del Seguro Social, that was demolished in order to build a shopping mall. Tigres played the 2000 and 2001 seasons in Foro Sol, winning the Mexican League championship back to back. The next year, Tigres moved to Puebla City and changed their name to Tigres de la Angelópolis and the Diablos Rojos remained as the park's only tenants.

The ballpark hosted three Major League Baseball exhibition games: in 2001 Pittsburgh Pirates vs. Tampa Bay Rays, in 2003 New York Mets vs. Los Angeles Dodgers and in 2004 Florida Marlins vs. Houston Astros.

Foro Sol hosted Pool B of the 2009 World Baseball Classic contested by Australia, Cuba, South Africa and Mexico.

In 2014, due to the return of the Mexican Grand Prix to the Autódromo Hermanos Rodríguez, Diablos Rojos played their last season at Foro Sol, since the venue needed renovations in order to host Formula 1. Diablos Rojos moved to the smaller Estadio Fray Nano.

During the time when the Diablos Rojos were Foro Sol's only tenants, Foro Sol was nicknamed Infierno Solar (Solar Hell).

Concerts
Madonna was the first world-class act to perform at the Foro Sol on 12 November 1993, when it was called Autódromo Hermanos Rodríguez for her first visit to Mexico in the Girlie Show tour on 10, 12 and 13 November 1993.

British alternative rock band Coldplay performed at the stadium on 3, 4, 6 and 7 April 2022. These four shows made the band the first international group in history to perform four shows on a single tour, as well as the biggest attendance in the stadium's history for an English speaking act, with 259,591 spectators.

During his farewell tour, Puerto Rican rapper Daddy Yankee performed five shows on 29 and 30 November, 2, 3 and 4 December 2022, with 322,028 attendees overall. He became the first act to achieve five consecutive nights and the biggest attendance gathered at the venue.

The venue is the host of Vive Latino, an annual multi-day rock music festival. It is one of the most important rock en español music festivals in the world, featuring a great variety of Mexican, Latin and Spanish groups of many genres, including performances of bands like Café Tacuba, Los Fabulosos Cadillacs, Gustavo Cerati, Ozomatli, Sepultura, Ska-P and non-Spanish speaking bands like The Wailers, Jane's Addiction, Deftones, The Chemical Brothers and The Mars Volta.

List of concerts at Foro Sol

References 

Baseball venues in Mexico
Sports venues in Mexico City
Sports venues completed in 1993
Music venues in Mexico
1993 establishments in Mexico
Music venues completed in 1993
World Baseball Classic venues